Cadwallader Jackson Wiltse (May 29, 1823 – June 21, 1900) was a member of the Wisconsin State Assembly.

Biography
Wiltse was born on May 29, 1823, in Clarence, New York. He settled on a farm in Mukwonago, Wisconsin in 1850 and on another farm in Lafayette, Chippewa County, Wisconsin in 1862. Wiltse later moved to Chippewa Falls, Wisconsin in 1868 and to Cadott, Wisconsin in 1889, where he died on June 21, 1900. He was a Baptist.

Political career
Wiltse was a member of the Assembly during the 1876 session. Other positions he held include Superintendent of Schools of Mukwonago, Town Clerk and Chairman of the town board (similar to city council) of Lafayette, City Attorney of Chippewa Falls, District Attorney and County Judge of Chippewa County, Wisconsin and justice of the peace. He was a Democrat.

References

External links
ebooksread.com

People from Clarence, New York
People from Mukwonago, Wisconsin
Politicians from Chippewa Falls, Wisconsin
Democratic Party members of the Wisconsin State Assembly
Wisconsin city council members
District attorneys in Wisconsin
Wisconsin city attorneys
Wisconsin state court judges
American justices of the peace
City and town clerks
School superintendents in Wisconsin
19th-century Baptists
Farmers from Wisconsin
1823 births
1900 deaths
Burials in Wisconsin
People from Chippewa County, Wisconsin
Baptists from New York (state)
Educators from New York (state)
19th-century American politicians
19th-century American judges
19th-century American educators
19th-century American lawyers